Say What? is a music video series that aired on American MTV in 1998. It was created at a time when MTV was being heavily criticized for not playing as many music videos as it had in the past. In an attempt to remedy this problem, five shows were created that centered on videos: 12 Angry Viewers, MTV Live, Artist's Cut, Total Request, and Say What?.

Premise
Hosted by MTV VJ Matt Pinfield, the premise behind Say What? was to show videos with lyrics which were fast or difficult to understand. The lyrics would scroll across the bottom of the screen as the video was played. This concept would develop into Say What? Karaoke.

References

1990s American music television series
1999 American television series debuts
1999 American television series endings
MTV original programming